Ognjanović is a Serbian surname. Notable people with the surname include:

 Dejan Ognjanović (born 1978), Montenegrin footballer
 Dejan Ognjanović (author) (born 1973), Serbian author
 Dragoslav Ognjanović (1961–2018), Serbian lawyer
 Konstantin Ognjanović (born 1973), Serbian footballer
 Ljubomir Ognjanović (1933–2008), Serbian footballer
 Marko Ognjanović, a leader in Tican's Rebellion
 Olivera Ognjanović (born 1969), Serbian politician
 Radivoje Ognjanović (born 1933), Serbian football manager and former footballer
 Srđan Ognjanović, Serbian mathematician

See also

Serbian surnames